Zacorisca digna is a species of moth of the family Tortricidae first described by Józef Razowski in 2013. It is found on Seram Island in Indonesia. The habitat consists of upper montane forests.

The wingspan is about 34 mm. The wings are creamish brown, except for the costal area from the base to the beyond middle, where it is suffused with cream brown in distal part. The hindwings are rust brown, with a brown anal area.

Etymology
The specific name refers to the distinct colouration of the adult and the peculiar shape of the uncus and is derived from Latin digna (meaning worthy).

References

Moths described in 2013
Zacorisca